Zac Brooks (born February 1, 1993) is a former American football running back who played in the National Football League (NFL). He was drafted by the Seattle Seahawks in the seventh round, 247th overall, of the 2016 NFL draft. He played college football at Clemson. He also spent time with the Kansas City Chiefs and Denver Broncos.

Early years
Brooks attended Jonesboro High School in Jonesboro, Arkansas where he completed high school early (December 2011) to attend college at Clemson University and returned to Jonesboro High School to graduate in 2012 with his senior class.

College career
Brooks committed to the Clemson on June 20, 2011 and enrolled on January 20, 2012. Brooks was enrolled at Clemson for four year playing in the 2012, 2013 and 2015 seasons and redshirting the 2014 due to a foot injury. In his college career Brooks played in 33 games with 115 carries for 599 yards and 8 total rushing and receiving touchdowns.

Professional career

Seattle Seahawks
On April 30, 2016, Brooks was drafted by the Seattle Seahawks in the seventh round of the 2016 NFL Draft. On May 9, 2016, the Seahawks announced that they had signed Brooks to his rookie contract. On August 30, 2016, he was waived by the Seahawks. He was signed to the practice squad on September 27, 2016. He was released by the Seahawks on October 25, 2016.

Kansas City Chiefs
On October 27, 2016, Brooks was signed to the Kansas City Chiefs' practice squad. He was released by the Chiefs on November 8, 2016.

Seattle Seahawks (second stint)
On November 23, 2016, Brooks was signed to the Seahawks' practice squad. He was released on November 29, 2016.

Denver Broncos
On December 14, 2016, Brooks was signed to the Broncos' practice squad. He signed a reserve/future contract with the Broncos on January 2, 2017.

On April 20, 2017, Brooks announced his retirement from the NFL after just one season without playing in a regular-season game.

Personal life
When Zac Brooks' football career is complete he has aspirations to become an interior designer.

References

External links
Denver Broncos bio
Seattle Seahawks bio
Clemson Tigers bio

1993 births
Living people
American football running backs
Clemson Tigers football players
Denver Broncos players
Kansas City Chiefs players
People from Jonesboro, Arkansas
Players of American football from Arkansas
Seattle Seahawks players